Takitani-ike  is an earthfill dam located in Mie Prefecture in Japan. The dam is used for irrigation. The dam impounds about 11  ha of land when full and can store 800 thousand cubic meters of water. The construction of the dam was completed in 1955.

See also
List of dams in Japan

References

Dams in Mie Prefecture